Bellardiochloa is a genus of grass in the family Poaceae.

Species
 Bellardiochloa argaea (Boiss. & Balansa) R.R.Mill 1985
 Bellardiochloa carica 	R.R. Mill 1985
 Bellardiochloa polychroa (Trautv.) Roshev.	1934
 Bellardiochloa variegata (Lam.) 	1983
 Bellardiochloa violacea (Bellardi) Chiov.

References

Pooideae
Poaceae genera